Club Olympique de Bamako is a Malian football club based in Bamako. They play in the top division in Malian football. Their home stadium is Stade 26 Mars. As of the 2010 season, the club's president was Moussa Konaté.

Achievements
 Malien Cup: 3
Winner: 2000, 2002, 2011
Runner-up: 1974, 2008

 Super Coupe National du Mali
Winner: 2011

Performance in CAF competitions
CAF Confederation Cup: 3 appearances
2010 – First Round
2012 – Play-off round
2014 – First Round

CAF Cup Winners' Cup: 2 appearances
2001 – First Round
2003 – Second Round

Crest

References

External links
Team profile – soccerway.com

Football clubs in Mali
Sport in Bamako
Association football clubs established in 1960
1960 establishments in Mali